Booker Wright may refer to:

Booker Wright, subject of Booker's Place: A Mississippi Story
Louis Booker Wright, American author, educator and librarian